VFC may stand for:

VESA Feature Connector, internal connector found mostly in some older graphics cards
VF Corporation, apparel and footwear company
Virtual Fighting Championship, a virtual reality fighting game (video game) released in 2018
Vitória F.C., Portuguese sports club founded in 1910
Vitória Futebol Clube (ES), Brazilian sports club founded in 1912
Vaccines for Children Program, a federally funded program in the United States providing no-cost vaccines to children
Voltage-to-frequency converter, a type of voltage-controlled oscillator

See also
VCF (disambiguation)
Valencia Football Club (disambiguation)
Vasco Fernandes Coutinho (disambiguation)
Victorian Football Club (disambiguation)
Vitória Futebol Clube (disambiguation)
Vlad Filat Cabinet (disambiguation)